The Georges Pompidou expressway ( is a former road for cars in Paris, France. As of 2022, it is an "urban park".

History 
France's then-prime-minister Georges Pompidou opened the 13-kilometer expressway in 1967.

From 2002, part of the highway became beach in summers, known as "Paris-Plages" and visited by 4 million people annually (as of 2007).

Cars were banned on the left bank of the Seine in 2013 and on the right bank in 2017, after several years of experiments. The removal of the car road happened under the mayors Bertrand Delanoë and Anne Hidalgo, the latter calling the process "a “reconquest” of the city for its residents. This development is seen is a key example of trend in Europe and around the world for cities discouraging cars from their roads.

Before the road was closed to them, 43,000 cars used the road daily. While some protested against the removal of cars, the majority supported it.

Sources 

Demolished highways
Parks in France